AA4 or AA-4 could mean:

 AA-4 Awl, NATO reporting name for the Raduga K-9
 AA4, Gardiner's designated symbol for a hieroglyph 
 Aa4,a credit rating given by Moody's Investors Service